Degradation Trip Volumes 1 & 2 is a double album by Jerry Cantrell, released on November 26, 2002 through Roadrunner Records. It is an expanded limited edition of Cantrell's Degradation Trip album, which was released five months earlier. All the songs were written long prior to the first release of Degradation Trip. The title was taken from the song "Solitude", the fifth track from the album. Roadrunner Records, uneasy toward the idea of a double album release, made Cantrell condense it, but promised to eventually release all of his material.

The track order of the expanded version, which differs from the first, is also presented in Cantrell's originally planned order. Faith No More drummer Mike Bordin and then-Ozzy Osbourne/Black Label Society bassist Robert Trujillo contributed to Degradation Trip, and would tour with Cantrell in support of it in 2001, before the album was released.

The album was released on vinyl for the first time through Music on Vinyl on February 8, 2019, with a limited edition of 2,000 individually numbered copies on quadruple color vinyl.

Recording and background

The liner notes for Degradation Trip Volumes 1 & 2 include an article by Don Kaye titled "A Long, Strange Trip". This describes the album's style and features quotes from Cantrell regarding its development and final release as a double album. Cantrell described the initial plans for the album:
"We probably had thirty-plus ideas - it could have been a triple record, you know what I mean? When I was making the record, my co-producer actually gave me George Harrison's triple record (All Things Must Pass), which is one of the coolest things anyone's ever given me. So yeah, this was intended to come out as Degradation Trip Volumes 1 & 2."

Label executives commended Cantrell's ambition but were uneasy about the idea of a double album. As Cantrell had already spent a year searching for a label that would take his album, he compromised and condensed his work on the promise that later on it would be released in its entirety.

For about four months in 1998, Cantrell locked himself in his home to write the 25 songs. He noted that much of the writing was inspired by the demise of Alice in Chains, describing it as "a situation where I had to move on, and not really being happy about it... So it was just coming to grips with all that stuff – and I'm still doing it, especially now that Layne's gone." Consequently, Degradation Trip boasts dark themes and bleak visuals. "It's the hardest record, in some ways, that I've done," Cantrell declared. "It's definitely the most lyrically brutal one. Sonically, it's right up there with Dirt as far as viciousness goes."

Songs like "Pig Charmer" and "Bargain Basement Howard Hughes" are often interpreted as being about the relationship between Cantrell and Staley. "Pig Charmer" has the lines "It turns out he's a big pussy, Satan hoof had its way". "Satan hoof" was the nickname that Staley gave to Cantrell – as mentioned during his interview with Rockline in 1998, while Staley was on the phone. "Owned" and "Pro False Idol" question the career of Cantrell and his status as a musician, while "Feel the Void" and "31/32" explore the concept of lives wasted. Cantrell elaborated, "Throughout the process of making this record, I often wondered at times whether I was insane or not. Sitting here, thinking back on it now, I probably had my moments." He also noted, however, the satisfaction in having released the album as he wanted and being able to put all of the intimate expression to bed.

Track listing

Personnel
 Jerry Cantrell – vocals, lead and rhythm guitar
 Robert Trujillo – bass guitar
 Mike Bordin – drums
Additional percussion by Walter Earl
Additional guitar on "Anger Rising" by Chris DeGarmo

Production
 Produced by Jerry Cantrell and Jeff Tomei
 Mixed by Jeff Tomei
 Recorded by Jeff Tomei and Tim Harkins, assisted by Jaime Sikora
 Mastered by George Marino
 A&R – Monte Conner
 Artwork and photography by Team Switzerland
 Drum tech – Walter Earl
 Guitar tech – Brett Allen
 Management – Bill Siddons for Siddons & Associates

References

Jerry Cantrell albums
2002 albums
Albums produced by Jerry Cantrell
Roadrunner Records albums
Rock albums by American artists
Hard rock albums by American artists
Heavy metal albums by American artists
Alternative rock albums by American artists